Sir John Nicholson Barran, 2nd Baronet (16 August 1872 – 8 July 1952) was a British Liberal Party politician.

Background and family
Barran was the son of John Barran (1844–1886) and the grandson of Sir John Barran, 1st Baronet. His mother was Eliza Henrietta Nicholson, daughter of Edward Nicholson. He was educated at Winchester and Trinity College, Cambridge, and succeeded his grandfather in the baronetcy in 1905.

He married firstly, at Emmanuel Episcopal Church, Boston on 18 November 1902, Alice Margarita Parks, daughter of Reverend Leighton Parks, rector of Emmanuel church. They had three sons and one daughter. After his first wife's death in 1939, he married secondly in 1946 Esther Frances Fisher, daughter of New Zealand politician Frank Fisher.

His eldest son Sir John Leighton Barran (1904–1974) succeeded in the baronetcy. His youngest son Sir David Barran became a prominent businessman and served as Managing Director and Chairman of Shell.

Barran died in July 1952, aged 79.

Political career
Barran was elected to the House of Commons at a by-election in March 1909 as the Member of Parliament (MP) for Hawick Burghs. 

He was re-elected with a large majority in January 1910

He was returned unopposed in December 1910. He served as Parliamentary Private Secretary to Prime Minister H. H. Asquith from 1910 to 1916. After the war he tried unsuccessfully to return to parliament, standing as Liberal candidate for Kingston upon Hull North West at the general elections of 1922, 1923 and 1924.

Apart from his political career he was a Justice of the Peace for the West Riding of Yorkshire.

References

www.thepeerage.com

External links 
 

1872 births
1952 deaths
Barran, Sir John, 2nd Baronet
Scottish Liberal Party MPs
Members of the Parliament of the United Kingdom for Scottish constituencies
UK MPs 1906–1910
UK MPs 1910
UK MPs 1910–1918
Parliamentary Private Secretaries to the Prime Minister
People educated at Winchester College
Alumni of Trinity College, Cambridge